Annette Kroon is a Dutch former cricketer who played as a wicket-keeper. She appeared for Netherlands in two One Day Internationals, both at the 1995 Women's European Cricket Cup in Dublin. She did not bat or bowl but took one catch and made one stumping.

References

External links
 
 

Living people
Dutch women cricketers
Netherlands women One Day International cricketers
Date of birth missing (living people)
Year of birth missing (living people)
Place of birth missing (living people)